The Crag Hotel, Penang is an abandoned hotel, and former school building on the north edge of Penang Hill.

Hotel history 
The original site was first occupied by a Mr Bright in 1845, and was most likely a private residence. By the early 1850s, it was used as a sanatorium. In 1896, Captain John W Kerr, an employee of the East India Company took over the lease and made numerous improvements to the site and was a popular retreat for Europeans who lived in Georgetown and Penang Island as a way to escape the intense heat and humidity of the lower coastal areas. In 1905, the lease was then taken over by four Armenian immigrants, the Sarkies brothers and following minor renovations was turned into a hotel that boasted nine bungalows. The hotel prospered until the outbreak of World War I, when it was sold to the colonial government. Although it was still managed by the Sarkies brothers, by 1925 it was handed over to the Federated Malay States Railway. Most of the hotel was completely rebuilt in 1930 and it continued operating until the Second World War, when it was requisitioned by the Japanese Army of occupation. The Crag hotel re-opened in 1947, but was not as popular as it had been and finally closed its doors in 1954.

School history 
After the war, the building fell into disuse for a number of years, until it was leased to the Uplands School The International School of Penang (Uplands). The international boarding school opened in 1955, as a safe location during the Malayan Emergency. During her overseas tour it was visited by Queen Elizabeth II in 1972. It was moved to a new site in 1977, and the buildings abandoned.

Film set location 
The abandoned buildings became a location for the 1992 Indochine (film), featuring Catherine Deneuve - a French period drama film set in colonial French Indochina during the 1930s to 1950s. Later it was again used for the BBC Channel 4 television series Indian Summers screened 2015–16, a British colonial historical drama series set in India during the 1930s-1940s, featuring Nikesh Patel as Aafrin Dalal and Julie Walters as Cynthia Coffin. The main building becoming the fictional Royal Simla Club.

Footnote 
There have been several attempts to interest an overseas hotel chain to redevelop the Crag Hotel site, but nothing has materialized to date.

See also 
The history of Armenians in Singapore and Malaysia

Other Sarkies Brothers hotels: Eastern & Oriental Hotel (1885) Penang, Raffles Hotel (1887) Singapore, Strand Hotel (1901) Yangon (Rangoon).

The Sea View Hotel, Singapore, originally built in 1906 and operated by the Sarkies Brothers under lease until 1931. It was one of the first hotels located outside of the busy town centre. Situated in the Tanjong Katong area, especially popular with clients who had recently recovered from illness and were seeking the tranquillity of an idyllic seaside resort surrounded by coconut trees to rest and recuperate. It was leased to various operators until 1962, when it was demolished and a new property bearing the same name was built in its place. The new hotel operated from 1969 to 2003 before it was pulled down to make way for a condominium development.

References & Sources 

 Crag Hotel, Abandoned Film Set in Penang: https://amyscrypt.com/crag-hotel-abandoned-penang/
 Crag Hotel, Abandoned hotel on Penang Hill: https://fromheretonowhere.com/asia/malaysia/abandoned-crag-hotel-penang-hill
 Article about TV series Indian Summers: https://www.telegraph.co.uk/education/expateducation/11649036/Indian-Summers-prompted-a-flood-of-Malaysian-school-memories.html
 Crag hotel, Penang: http://www.penangseaview.com/crag-hotel-penang-hill/
 Picture of Crag Hotel Penang 1933: https://eresources.nlb.gov.sg/pictures/Details/26b034b6-8dc4-41e8-b6a3-2bf890d87d59

Defunct hotels